German submarine U-448 was a Type VIIC U-boat of Nazi Germany's Kriegsmarine during World War II.

She carried out four patrols. She sank no ships.

She was a member of ten wolfpacks.

She was sunk by Allied warships, northeast of the Azores on 14 April 1944.

Design
German Type VIIC submarines were preceded by the shorter Type VIIB submarines. U-448 had a displacement of  when at the surface and  while submerged. She had two shafts and two  propellers.

U-448 was fitted with five  torpedo tubes (four fitted at the bow and one at the stern), fourteen torpedoes, one  SK C/35 naval gun, 220 rounds, and a  C/30 anti-aircraft gun. The boat had a complement of between forty-four and sixty.

Service history
The submarine was laid down on 1 July 1941 at Schichau-Werke in Danzig (now Gdansk) as yard number 1508, launched on 23 May 1942 and commissioned on 1 August under the command of Oberleutnant zur See Helmut Dauter.

She served with the 8th U-boat Flotilla from 1 August 1942 for training and the 7th flotilla from 1 February 1943 for operations.

First patrol
U-432s first patrol was split in two and started with her departure from Kiel in Germany. She docked in Bergen in Norway at the end of the first part on 4 February 1943.

Part two began from Bergen on 6 February; she headed for the Atlantic Ocean via the gap separating the Iceland and Faroe. She arrived at St. Nazaire in occupied France on 25 March.

Second and third patrols
For her second sortie, she covered the area northwest of the Azores.

On her third foray, she was attacked southwest of Iceland by a Canadian Sunderland flying boat of No. 422 Squadron RCAF. The aircraft crashed, five men died. U448 also suffered casualties – one dead and two men wounded. Due to the damage sustained, the boat was compelled to abort the patrol.

Fourth patrol and loss
Having left St. Nazaire on 14 February 1943, she travelled as far as the Denmark Strait (between Greenland and Iceland). The submarine's fourth sally was, at 61 days, her longest. On 14 April 1944, she was northeast of the Azores when she was sunk by depth charges from the Canadian frigate  and the British sloop .

Nine men went down with U-448; there were forty-two survivors.

Wolfpacks
U-448 took part in ten wolfpacks, namely:
 Neptun (18 – 28 February 1943) 
 Wildfang (28 February – 5 March 1943) 
 Westmark (6 – 7 March 1943) 
 Amsel (22 April – 3 May 1943) 
 Amsel 3 (3 – 6 May 1943) 
 Rhein (7 – 10 May 1943) 
 Elbe 2 (10 – 14 May 1943) 
 Rossbach (24 September – 9 October 1943) 
 Schlieffen (14 – 18 October 1943) 
 Preussen (22 February – 14 March 1944)

References

Bibliography

External links

German Type VIIC submarines
U-boats commissioned in 1942
U-boats sunk in 1944
U-boats sunk by depth charges
U-boats sunk by British warships
U-boats sunk by Canadian warships
1942 ships
Ships built in Danzig
World War II shipwrecks in the Atlantic Ocean
World War II submarines of Germany
Maritime incidents in April 1944
Ships built by Schichau